Neritopsis atlantica is a species of sea snail, a marine gastropod mollusk in the family Neritopsidae.

Description

Distribution
This marine species occurs off Cuba.

References

 Sarasua, H., 1973. El genero Neritopsis (Mollusca: Neritoidea) en el Atlantico y descripcion de su Segunda especie viviente,. Poeyana 118: 6 pp

External links
  Hoerle R.C. (1974). A Recent Caribbean species of the genus Neritopsis (Mollusca: Gastropoda). Tulane Studies in Geology and Paleontology. 11: 103-104.
 Lozouet, P. (2009). A new Neritopsidae (Mollusca, Gastropoda, Neritopsina) from French Polynesia. Zoosystema. 31(1): 189-198

Neritopsidae
Gastropods described in 1973